South Quay is a Docklands Light Railway (DLR) station on the Isle of Dogs, East London, England. The station is between Crossharbour and Heron Quays stations and is in Travelcard Zone 2. South Quay is in Millwall and is located on the southern shore of the South Dock of the West India Docks; the current station platforms sit astride the channel connecting Millwall Dock to the West India Docks.

History
The original South Quay station opened in 1987 in Millwall and was a standard DLR phase 1 elevated station, subsequently extended to permit the use of 2 unit trains.

In 1996, near the station, the Docklands bombing killed 2 people and injured over 30. The IRA had claimed responsibility for it. A memorial plaque at the station was unveiled in December 2009, commemorating the victims of the 1996 bombing.

Relocation
The station was constrained by sharp curves at both ends and could not, therefore, be further extended on its former site. The DLR's plan to operate 3 unit trains on this line therefore included the relocation of this station to a new site over Millwall Dock some distance to the east, resulting in the relocated station partly being in Cubitt Town.

In October 2004, Transport for London announced plans to close and replace South Quay station with a station at a new location because of increased use of the Docklands Light Railway. The reason for the move was that the platforms could only accommodate two-unit trains. They would need to be lengthened by thirty metres for three-unit trains but the curves either side of the station precluded extension work.

The new station, on a straight section of track  to the east, opened on Monday 26 October 2009 with the old station closing on Friday 23 October.

Connections
London Buses route D8  serves the station.

Surrounding area
South Quay is surrounded by commercial offices and residential developments and their for the residential, commercial and entertainment development in this part of Millwall. The highrise Pan Peninsula Towers is immediately adjacent to the station. A small shopping centre, South Quay Plaza, is across the road from the station. The Hilton London Canary Wharf hotel is also close to the station. Further afield, the southern shore of the South Dock of the West India Docks to the west of the station is lined with restaurants. The South Quay Footbridge provides a connection to the Canary Wharf private estate.

References

External links 

 South Quay station on Docklands Light Railway's website

Docklands Light Railway stations in the London Borough of Tower Hamlets
Railway stations in Great Britain opened in 1987
Millwall